The following is a chronicle of events during the year 1973 in ice hockey.

National Hockey League
Art Ross Trophy as the NHL's leading scorer during the regular season: Phil Esposito ]  
Hart Memorial Trophy: for the NHL's Most Valuable Player:  Bobby Clarke
Stanley Cup -  The Montreal Canadiens defeated the Chicago Blackhawks in the 1973 Stanley Cup Finals
With the first overall pick in the 1973 NHL Amateur Draft, the New York Islanders selected Denis Potvin

World Hockey Association
The New England Whalers defeated the Winnipeg Jets to win the inaugural Avco World Trophy.

 Andre Lacroix won the WHA scoring championship
 Bobby Hull won the WHA Most Valuable Player Award

Canadian Hockey League
Ontario Hockey League:  J. Ross Robertson Cup.
Quebec Major Junior Hockey League:  won President's Cup (QMJHL) for the first time in team history
Western Hockey League:   President's Cup (WHL) for the first time in team history
Memorial Cup:

International hockey

World Hockey Championship

European hockey

Minor League hockey
AHL:   Calder Cup
IHL:   Turner Cup.
 Allan Cup:

Junior A hockey

University hockey
 NCAA Division I Men's Ice Hockey Tournament

Deaths

Season articles

See also
1973 in sports

References